Ocypus ophthalmicus is a species of rove beetle belonging to the family Staphylinidae, subfamily Staphylininae.

These beetles are present in most of Europe, in the eastern Palearctic realm, in North Africa, and in the Near East.

Its head, pronotum, and elytra have metallic blue reflections, with a shiny surface of pronotum.

O. ophthalmicus is a eurytopic species and can be encountered both in deciduous forests (Quercus spp., Fagus spp.) and in xeric habitats. Generally, they are found in detritus, under stones, and on dung. They are nocturnal predators (especially of worms, snails, larvae, etc.).

They are known for their habit of raising their long abdomens and opening their jaws, like a threatened scorpion. In this defense posture, they secrete an irritating substance, with a very unpleasant smell.

Subspecies
Ocypus ophthalmicus var. atrocyaneus   Fairmaire, 1860 
Ocypus ophthalmicus var. balearicus  (J. Müller, 1926) 
Ocypus ophthalmicus var. benoiti  Drugmand, 1998  
Ocypus ophthalmicus var. brigitteae  Drugmand, 1998 
Ocypus ophthalmicus var. ophthalmicus  (Scopoli, 1763) 
Ocypus ophthalmicus var. rodopensis  Coiffait, 1971

External links
 Biolib
 Fauna Europaea
 Zin.ru

Staphylininae
Beetles of Europe
Beetles described in 1763
Taxa named by Giovanni Antonio Scopoli